Roy Charles Taylor (December 11, 1889 – June 22, 1963) was a Canadian politician who served as a member of the Legislative Assembly of Alberta from 1935 to 1940, sitting with the Social Credit caucus in government. He died after a brief illness in 1963.

References

Alberta Social Credit Party MLAs
1963 deaths
1889 births